Jonathan C. Hall (February 27, 1808 – June 11, 1874) was a justice of the Iowa Supreme Court from February 15, 1854, to January 15, 1855, appointed from Des Moines County, Iowa.

References

Justices of the Iowa Supreme Court
1808 births
1874 deaths